Arturo Segado Muñoz (born 17 April 1997) is a Spanish footballer who plays for SD Leioa as a midfielder.

Career 
Born in Andújar, Jaén, Andalusia, Segado finished his formation with Málaga CF. In 2016, he was promoted to the B-team. He played 34 matches and found the net once. He also captained the club's juvenile team which debuted in the UEFA Youth League.

In July 2017, Segado terminated his contract with Málaga. In the following month, he signed for Deportivo Alavés and was immediately loaned to Croatian side NK Rudeš for one year. He made his debut for the Croatian club in a 3–2 defeat against Dinamo Zagreb.

On 8 January 2019, after another loan stint at NK Istra 1961, Segado left the Glorioso and joined another reserve team, Deportivo Fabril in Segunda División B. On 3 September 2019 it was confirmed, that Segado had joined CD Badajoz. However, he did only play one game for the club in the Copa del Rey, before being loaned out to Mérida AD on the last day of the January 2020 market.

References

External links 

1997 births
Living people
Sportspeople from the Province of Jaén (Spain)
Spanish footballers
Footballers from Andalusia
Association football midfielders
Segunda División B players
Tercera División players
Atlético Malagueño players
Deportivo Alavés players
Deportivo Fabril players
CD Badajoz players
Mérida AD players
SD Leioa players
Croatian Football League players
NK Rudeš players
NK Istra 1961 players
Spanish expatriate footballers
Spanish expatriate sportspeople in Croatia
Expatriate footballers in Croatia